Georg Otto Hermann Balck (7 December 1893 – 29 November 1982) was a highly decorated officer of the German Army who served in both World War I and World War II, rising to the rank of General der Panzertruppe.

Early career

Balck was born in Danzig - Langfuhr, present-day Wrzeszcz in Poland. He was the son of William Balck and his wife Mathilde, née Jensen. His family had a long military tradition, and his father was a senior officer in the Imperial German Army.

On 10 April 1913 Balck entered the Hanoverian Rifle Battalion 10 in Goslar as a cadet.  From 12 February 1914  he attended the Hanoverian Military College, where he remained until called up with the outbreak of the First World War in August.

Balck served as a mountain infantry officer, and his unit played a key role in the Schlieffen Plan, leading the crossing at Sedan. He fought on the western, eastern, Italian and Balkan fronts. He served three years as a company commander, ending the war in command of a machine-gun company. At one point he led an extended patrol that operated independently behind Russian lines for several weeks. Over the course of the war he was wounded seven times and awarded the Iron Cross First Class. Balck was nominated for Prussia's highest honor, the Pour le Mérite, in October 1918, but the war ended before his citation completed processing.

During the interwar period Balck was selected as one of the 4,000 officers to continue on in the military serving in the Reichswehr. He transferred to the 18th Cavalry Regiment in 1922, and remained with that unit for 12 years. Balck twice turned down a post in the German General Staff, the normal path for advancing to high rank in the German army, preferring instead to remain a line officer.

World War II

At the outbreak of World War II in 1939, Balck was serving in the Oberkommando des Heeres (OKH) as a staff officer in the Inspectorate of Motorized Troops, which was in charge of refitting and reorganizing the growing panzer forces. In October he was placed in command of one of the mechanised regiments of the 1st Panzer Division, with which he served during the Battle of France. The 1st Panzer Division made up a part of Guderian's panzer corps. Balck's regiment spearheaded a crossing over the Meuse, and established a bridgehead on the far side.

During the winter of 1940 through the spring of 1941 he commanded a panzer regiment, and led this unit during the Battle of Greece. He later commanded a panzer brigade in the same division. He returned to staff duties with the OKH in the Inspectorate of Armoured Forces in July 1941. In May 1942, Balck went to the Eastern Front in command of the 11th Panzer Division in Ukraine and southern Russia. Following the encirclement of the 6th Army at Stalingrad in the Soviet Operation Uranus, the German southern front faced a generalized collapse. Balck's division took part in the efforts to stop the Soviet advance. In battles along the Chir River his division destroyed an entire Soviet Tank Corps and much of the Soviet 5th Tank Army. For this and other achievements Balck was made one of only twenty-seven officers in the entire war who received the Knight's Cross with Oak Leaves, Swords, and Diamonds.

Balck was then given command of the Heer's elite unit, Großdeutschland Division which he led at Zhitomir in 1943. After a brief posting to Italy in which he commanded the XIV Panzer Corps, he returned to command the XLVIII Panzer Corps on the Eastern Front in December 1943, as well as the operations against the Soviet winter/spring offensive in western Ukraine in 1944. In July 1944 Balck commanded the Corps during the initial phase of the Soviet Lvov-Sandomierz Offensive. He was closely involved in the failed relief attempt of the encircled XIII Army Corps in the Brody pocket, where it was destroyed. In August 1944 he assumed command of the 4th Panzer Army.

In September 1944 Balck was transferred from 4th Panzer Army in Poland to the Western Front to command Army Group G in relief of General Johannes Blaskowitz in the Alsace region of France. Balck was unable to stop the Allied advance under General George S. Patton, and in late December he was relieved of command of Army Group G and placed in the officer reserve pool. By the intervention of General Heinz Guderian he was transferred to command the reconstituted 6th Army in Hungary, which also had operational control of two Hungarian armies. Balck's unit surrendered to the U.S. XX Corps in Austria on 8 May 1945.

Postwar life
Balck was a POW and remained in captivity until 1947. He declined to participate in the US Army Historical Division's study on the war. After the war Balck found employment as a depot worker. In 1948 he was arrested for murder for the execution of artillery commander Lieutenant-Colonel Johann Schottke. The incident in question occurred while Balck served as commander of Army Group G on the western front. On 28 November 1944 near Saarbrücken, Schottke's unit had failed to provide its supportive artillery fire upon its target area. When searched for he was found drunk on duty. Balck held a summary judgment, and Schottke was executed by firing squad. The sentence and execution were conducted without the ordained military tribunal. Balck was found guilty and sentenced to three years. He served half of this sentence before being granted early release.

Hermann Balck was sentenced by a French military court in Colmar to 20 years of hard labour for his role in the scorched earth Operation Waldfest but never extradited.

In the late 1970s and early 1980s Balck and Friedrich von Mellenthin participated in seminars and panel discussions with senior NATO leaders at the US Army War College in Carlisle, Pennsylvania.

Career assessment
According to the historian David T. Zabecki, Balck was considered a gifted commander of armored troops, exemplified by his handling of 11th Panzer Division and XLVIII Panzer Corps during 1942–43. In reviewing Balck's command of the division during the Chir River crisis of December 1942, U.S. General William DePuy estimated Balck to have been "perhaps the best division commander in the German Army." Some battles Balck directed are described in Panzer Battles, the memoir of the former general Friedrich von Mellenthin, whom he met when Balck's 11th Panzer Division came under the command of the XLVIII Panzer Corps. At the time Mellenthin was serving as Chief of Staff of the XLVIII Panzer Corps.

Balck started the war as an Oberstleutnant (lieutenant-colonel) in 1939 and ended it as a General der Panzertruppe (general of armored troops). Balck was one of only twenty-seven officers in the Wehrmacht to receive the Knight's Cross with Oak Leaves, Swords, and Diamonds. His career was detailed in contrast to that of Alfred Jodl in Weapons and Hope by Freeman Dyson. Balck's own autobiography is entitled Ordnung im Chaos: Erinnerungen, 1893-1948.

Awards
 Iron Cross (1914) 2nd Class (15 October 1914) & 1st Class (26 November 1914)
 Knight of the House Order of Hohenzollern with Swords (3 December 1917)
 Military Merit Order, 4th class with Swords (Bavaria; 15 November 1914)
 Military Merit Cross 3rd Class (Austria-Hungary; 28 February 1916)
 Order of Bravery, 3rd class, 1st stage with Swords (Bulgaria; 2 December 1941)
 Wound Badge (1918) in Gold (10 May 1918)

 Clasp to the Iron Cross (1939) 2nd Class (12 May 1940) & 1st Class (13 May 1940)
 Knight's Cross of the Iron Cross with Oak Leaves, Swords and Diamonds
 Knight's Cross on 3 June 1940 as Oberstleutnant and commander of Schützen-Regiment 1
 155th Oak Leaves on 20 December 1942 as Generalmajor and commander of the 11. Panzer-Division
 25th Swords on 4 March 1943 as Generalleutnant and commander of the 11. Panzer-Division
 19th Diamonds on 31 August 1944 as General der Panzertruppe and acting commander of the 4. Panzerarmee

Promotions in the Wehrmacht

Works
 Balck, Hermann (1981). Ordnung im Chaos / Erinnerungen 1893 - 1948. Biblio, Osnabrück. .
 Balck, Hermann (2015). "Order in Chaos: The Memoirs of General of Panzer Troops Hermann Balck" Ed. and Trans. Major General David T. Zabecki, USA (Ret.) and Lieutenant Colonel Dieter J. Biedekarken, USA (Ret.). UP Kentucky, Lexington. .

References

Citations

Bibliography

 
 Mellenthin, Friedrich-Wilhelm von Panzer Battles. Old Saybrook, CT: Konecky & Konecky, 1956.

External links 
 Germany's Forgotten Panzer Commander

1893 births
1982 deaths
Military personnel from Gdańsk
People from West Prussia
Generals of Panzer Troops
German Army personnel of World War I
Prussian Army personnel
Recipients of the Knight's Cross of the Iron Cross with Oak Leaves, Swords and Diamonds
Recipients of the Order of Bravery
Recipients of the clasp to the Iron Cross, 1st class
Reichswehr personnel
20th-century Freikorps personnel